Aoife Doyle (born 2 June 1995) is an Irish rugby player from Limerick. She plays for Railway Union, Munster and the Ireland women's national rugby union team. She is a student at teacher training college in Dublin.

Club career 
Doyle's first club was Shannon RFC in Limerick and she continued to play for them initially when she joined All-Ireland League side Railway Union until she concentrated exclusively on sevens rugby for six years.

International career 
Doyle was selected for the Ireland women's national rugby union team that won the 2015 Women's Six Nations when she was 18 years of age. She debuted as a starter, on the wing, against France in Ashbourne and was a replacement versus Wales and Scotland.

She then concentrated solely on playing for the Ireland women's national rugby sevens team for six years, making her debut in the World Rugby Sevens Series in Clermont-Ferrand in 2016.

She was part of the team that was sixth at the 2018 Sevens World Cup in San Francisco and the team that finished fourth in Sydney in February 2019, Ireland's best ever result on the World Seven Series tour.

After they failed to qualify for the Tokyo Olympics she retired from international sevens rugby and was recalled to the national XVs team by head coach Adam Griggs.

In the 2020 Women's Six Nations Doyle started against Scotland and England and was a replacement against Wales.

Personal life 
Doyle, from Clareview in Limerick city, went to school in Laurel Hill Secondary School and both her parents are teachers. She started studying in St Patrick's Drumcondra after school but quit college due to the difficulty of mixing it with playing on the International Sevens circuit.

In 2020 she quit her secretarial job in a drug treatment centre to return to college, to study teaching, at the Marino Institute of Education.

Honours 
 2015 Six Nations winner with Ireland

References

External links 
 https://www.irishrugby.ie/women/aoife-doyle/

Living people
1995 births
Irish female rugby union players
Rugby union wings
Ireland international women's rugby sevens players
Sportspeople from Limerick (city)